Askgrenda is a small village in Lier municipality, Norway.

Villages in Buskerud